The 1964 Tulsa Golden Hurricane football team represented the University of Tulsa during the 1964 NCAA University Division football season. In their fourth year under head coach Glenn Dobbs, the Golden Hurricane compiled a 9–2 record, 3–1 against Missouri Valley Conference opponents, led the country in scoring with an average of 36.2 points per game, and defeated Ole Miss, 14-7 in the 1964 Bluebonnet Bowl.  Under Glenn Dobbs, Tulsa led the nation in passing for five straight years from 1962 to 1966.

Schedule

Record passing attack
The team was led by quarterback Jerry Rhome.  Rhome broke 16 NCAA major college records in 1964, including the following:

Single game
 504 yards of total offense in a game
 35 pass completions in a game
 448 passing yards in a game
 7 touchdown passes in a game

Season
 3,128 yards of total offense
 224 pass completions
 2,870 passing yards
 32 touchdown passes
 198 consecutive passes without an interception
 .687 pass completion percentage

Career
 448 pass completions
 5,472 passing yards

At the end of the 1964 season, Rhome finished second behind John Huarte in close voting for the Heisman Trophy with Rhome receiving 186 first place votes to 216 for Huarte.   He was also selected as a first-team All-American by Football News, the Football Writers Association of America, and the United Press International, and he went on to play seven seasons in the National Football League (NFL).

End Howard Twilley led the NCAA major college players with 95 catches for 1,173 receiving yards and 13 touchdowns. He also ranked second in scoring (110) points, one point behind Brian Piccolo. Twilley went on to a long NFL career with the Miami Dolphins and was inducted in 1992 into the College Football Hall of Fame.

References

Tulsa
Tulsa Golden Hurricane football seasons
Bluebonnet Bowl champion seasons
Tulsa Golden Hurricane football